Wilber Alirio Varela Fajardo (November 6, 1957 – 2008), also known as Jabón ("Soap"), was a Colombian drug trafficker. He was the leader of the Norte del Valle Cartel. A Racketeer Influenced and Corrupt Organizations Act indictment was filed in the District Court of the District of Columbia by the Narcotics and Dangerous Drugs Section of the United States Department of Justice Criminal Division against the leaders of the Norte del Valle Cartel, including Varela. According to the indictment, the Norte del Valle Cartel exported approximately 500 metric tons of cocaine worth over $10 billion from Colombia to the United States, often through Mexico, between 1990 and 2004. The indictment was unsealed in May 2004. A provisional arrest warrant was issued and was sent to the U.S. Embassy in Bogotá.

In addition, in March 2004, a grand jury in the Eastern District of New York indicted Varela on Drug Trafficking Charges. The United States Department of State offered a reward of up to $5 million for information leading to the arrest and/or conviction of Varela.

Early years 
He was born in Roldanillo, Valle del Cauca, on November 6, 1957. He claimed to be a retired National Police sergeant, but no official documents were found to confirm this. At the beginning of the 1990s, he worked in the cocaine laboratories of Andrés López López "Florecita" and later began working with the Rodríguez Orejuela brothers security, collections, and hiring assassins.

Death
In early 2008, Varela Fajardo was found murdered in a hotel resort in the state of Mérida, in Venezuela. On January 30, 2008, Venezuelan authorities confirmed his death after analyzing his fingerprints.

Colombian authorities believe he was murdered by his own men on orders of jailed paramilitary drug lord Carlos Mario Jiménez, alias "Macaco", to end Varela's power struggle in the rival city Medellín and surrounding areas in Antioquia. With Varela's death, Jimenez consolidated himself as the maximum authority over drug trafficking in Colombia, with control of the drug trade in 10 Colombian states and authority over the cartel. Jimenez was later extradited to the United States on May 7, 2008, on drug trafficking charges.

Popular culture
In TV series El Señor De Los Cielos, El Cartel and film, he is portrayed as the character Milton Jimenez 'El Cabo' (The Corporal), by the Colombian actor Robinson Diaz.

See also

Illegal drug trade in Colombia
Illegal drug trade in Venezuela

References

External links 
¿Quién era Wilber Varela, alias 'Jabón'?

1958 births
2008 deaths
Colombian drug traffickers
Colombian people murdered abroad
Norte del Valle Cartel traffickers
People from Valle del Cauca Department
People murdered in Venezuela
Deaths by firearm in Venezuela
2008 murders in Venezuela
Colombian police officers